Isaac Brookes (7 January 1861 – 1935) was an English footballer who played in the Football League for Northwich Victoria and Stoke.

Career
Brookes was born in Bilston and was a wicket-keeper for the Staffordshire County Cricket Club. In 1891 Stoke were suffering from a goalkeeper crisis with both Bill Rowley and Wilf Merritt out with injuries and Brookes was signed by the club. He did well as Stoke remained unbeaten and claimed the Football Alliance title and with it an instant return to the Football League. He remained at Stoke but lost his place once Rowley had recovered and Brookes joined Northwich Victoria.

Career statistics

Honours
with Stoke
Football Alliance champions: 1890–91

References

English footballers
Northwich Victoria F.C. players
Stoke City F.C. players
1861 births
1935 deaths
English Football League players
Football Alliance players
Association football goalkeepers